Tabernash is an unincorporated town, a post office, and a census-designated place (CDP) located in and governed by Grand County, Colorado, United States. The Tabernash post office has the ZIP Code 80478. At the United States Census 2010, the population of the Tabernash CDP was 417, while the population of the 80478 ZIP Code Tabulation Area was 1,606 including adjacent areas.

History
The Tabernash Post Office has been in operation since 1905. The community has the name of a Ute Indian.

1984 airplane crash
On August 10, 1984, a Cessna L-19 Bird Dog (registration , piloted by James Jeb Caddell, 36, crashed in a forest near Tabernash. The aircraft was en route from Granby to Jeffco Airport, Colorado. The wreckage was found by backpackers three years later on August 23, 1987. A 6½ minute video shot from a VHS camcorder mounted on the instrument panel was found at the site. The heavily damaged tape, some of it hanging from tree branches, was recovered and repaired by Colorado deputy sheriff Dale Wood. Subsequent analysis of the footage revealed that the pilot had not taken into account the density altitude conditions that existed on the day of the flight. The aircraft was unable to climb away from steadily rising terrain. In an attempt to return to the departure airfield, the pneumatic stall warning of the airplane sounded three times during a turn to the right. The pilot could be heard yelling, "Damn, hang on Ronnie!" to his one backseat passenger, Ronald Hugh Wilmond, 36, three seconds before impacting the terrain and trees.

The Caddells had put a 20-year moratorium (via the FAA) on the release of the film to the general public with the only stipulation that it (at the FAA's request to the Caddells) be shown only to flight instructors at conventions and workshops. The moratorium eventually expired and was not renewed, and thus the footage became part of the public domain. The video is now viewable on YouTube.

Geography
Tabernash is located in the valley of the Fraser River. U.S. Route 40 passes through the community, leading northwest  to Granby and southeast  to Winter Park.

Climate
This climate type is dominated by the winter season, a long, bitterly cold period with short, clear days, relatively little precipitation mostly in the form of snow, and low humidity. According to the Köppen Climate Classification system, Tabernash has a subarctic climate, abbreviated "Dfc" on climate maps.

Demographics

See also

Outline of Colorado
Index of Colorado-related articles
State of Colorado
Colorado cities and towns
Colorado census designated places
Colorado counties
Grand County, Colorado
Arapaho National Forest

References

External links

Tabernash @ Colorado.com
Tabernash @ UncoverColorado.com
Grand County website

Census-designated places in Grand County, Colorado
Census-designated places in Colorado